São Nicolau Tolentino (Portuguese for Saint Nicholas of Tolentino) is a freguesia (civil parish) of Cape Verde. It covers the western part of the municipality of São Domingos, on the island of Santiago.

Subdivision
The freguesia consists of the following settlements (population at the 2010 census):

Achada Loura (pop: 89) 
Achada Mitra  (pop: 106)
Água de Gato (pop: 957)
Banana (pop: 180) 
Chamine  (pop: 79)
Dacabalaio (pop: 47)
Fontes Almeida  (pop: 745)
Gudim (pop: 362)
Lagoa (pop: 390)
Mato Afonso (pop: 327)
Mendes Faleiro Cabral (pop: 86)
Mendes Faleiro Rendeiro (pop: 117)
Nora (pop: 323)
Pó de Saco  (pop: 174)
Ribeirão Chiqueiro (pop: 773)
Robão Cal (pop: 149)
Rui Vaz (pop: 1,078)
São Domingos (also: Várzea da Igreja, pop: 2,818, city)
Veneza (pop: 1)

See also
Administrative divisions of Cape Verde

References

São Domingos Municipality, Cape Verde
Parishes of Cape Verde